Jean-Claude Nicolas Forestier (9 January 1861 – 26 October 1930) was a French landscape architect who trained with Adolphe Alphand and became conservator of the promenades of Paris.

Works

Forestier developed an arboretum at Vincennes and the gardens of the Champ-de-Mars below the Eiffel Tower. In 1925 he became Inspector of Gardens for the International Exhibition of Decorative Arts and undertook projects in the Americas. 

In 1925, he moved to Havana for five years to collaborate with architects and landscape designers, where he designed the gardens for the El Capitolio and worked on the master plan of the city, aiming to create a harmonic balance between classical forms and the tropical landscape. He embraced and connected the city's road networks while accentuating prominent landmarks. He had great influence in Havana, although many of his ideas were cut short by the great depression in 1929. 

He also made a plan for the improvement of Buenos Aires and the seaside town of Ostende, Buenos Aires. In Spain, he designed the Maria Luisa Park in Seville and the gardens of La Casa del Rey Moro in Ronda.

Also see
 Havana Plan Piloto

 Paseo del Prado, Havana

 La Alameda de Paula, Havana

 Paseo de Tacón

Writings
 FORESTIER Jean Claude Nicolas, Grandes villes et systèmes de parcs, Paris, Hachette, 1908, 50p.
 FORESTIER Jean Claude Nicolas, Grandes villes et systèmes de parcs, Paris, Norma, rééd. du texte de 1908 présentée par B. Leclerc et S. Tarrago, 1997, 383p.
 FORESTIER Jean Claude Nicolas, Jardins,[carnet de plans et de croquis, Paris, Ed Picard, 1994.
 LECLERC Bénédicte, Jean Claude Nicolas FORESTIER,1861-1930, du Jardin au paysage urbain, Paris, Ed Picard, 2000, 283p.
 LECLERC Bénédicte, Jean Claude Nicolas FORESTIER,1861-1930, La science des jardins au service de l’art urbain, Revue Pages Paysages, N°2, 1988–89, p24-29.
 LECLERC Bénédicte, Jardin, Paysage, urbanisme : la mission de Jean C-N Forestier au Maroc en 1913, Nancy, Ed Ecole d’architecture de Nancy, 1993, s-p.
 LE DANTEC Jean-Pierre, Le Sauvage et le régulier. Art des jardins et paysagisme en France au XXième siècle, Paris, Ed du Moniteur, 2002, p93 à 101.

1861 births
1930 deaths
People from Aix-les-Bains
École Polytechnique alumni
Sciences Po alumni
French urban planners
French landscape architects
Officiers of the Légion d'honneur
Modernist architects

Architects from Havana